David Alex Villegas (born December 19, 1995), known by his stage name Skinnyfromthe9 (formerly stylized $kinnyFromThe9), is an American rapper and singer from Somerville, New Jersey. He first gained widespread attention after the release of his song "Love Blast" in late 2017. He then signed to L.A. Reid's record label, HITCO, in 2018. He released his debut mixtape, It's An Evil World, in November 2018.

Early life
David Alex Villegas was born in Hialeah, Florida. He is of mixed Puerto Rican, Colombian, and Dominican descent. He grew up largely in Somerville, New Jersey, although he and his family moved around frequently. As a child, his father was imprisoned, and his mother became involved with another man. During Villegas' adolescence, his mother and stepfather engaged in scams and identity fraud until his stepfather was eventually caught and spent time in prison. Villegas also spent time living in homeless shelters and hotels as a youth. He began focusing on hip hop as a teenager after his father purchased a mic for him. He adopted the stage name, Skinnyfromthe9, because his nickname was "Skinny" and he was from area code 908 (colloquially, "the 9").

Career
Skinnyfromthe9 began putting his music on SoundCloud in 2016. In 2017, he released the songs, "Family Rich" featuring Jay Critch and "Count It" featuring Stitches. In late 2017, he released the single, "Love Blast," which would go on to accumulate more than 3.5 million streams on SoundCloud. In January 2018, Skinny joined Fetty Wap on his "FMF Tour." Later that year, it was announced that he had signed to L.A. Reid's new record label, HITCO.

In April 2018, he released a music video for "Love Blast" and also released the single, "Back When I Was Broke." The following month, he published music videos for "Back When I Was Broke" and "Pink Choppas." Rappers Wiz Khalifa and Russ made cameos in the former video. Later that month, Skinny also released the songs, "Space" and "I Drip."

Beginning in June 2018, Skinny was supposed to join rapper, 24hrs, on his "3200 Lenox Rd." tour, but 24hrs was hospitalized in June, and the tour was canceled. In July 2018, Skinny made a cameo appearance in the video for PnB Rock's "London." The following month, he released the single, "Jump Out That," featuring PnB Rock. Later in August, Skinny was arrested on suspicion of simple assault and theft.

In October 2018, while serving time in jail, he released a freestyle rap along with two more songs, "Alone" and "Songs About You." He was released from jail in November 2018. Soon after his release, he published the music video for his song, "Just Left Jail." His debut mixtape, It's An Evil World, was released on November 30, 2018, through HITCO. It featured guest appearances from Fetty Wap, PnB Rock, and Kap G. going into 2020 skinnyfromthe9 did a song with Hitta Castro that blow up called "In My Feelings2.

Legal issues
Since 2014, Skinnyfromthe9 has been charged with several minor offenses such as shoplifting and reckless driving. Many of those charges were later dropped.

In August 2018, Skinny, his father, his brother, and a fourth defendant were arrested and charged with kidnapping and aggravated assault in relation to an incident in Somerset County, New Jersey in which the four men were accused of luring another man into a vehicle and striking him. In September, the charges for Skinny were downgraded to luring an adult, simple assault, and theft after he took a plea deal that also allowed him to avoid prison time in exchange for a probation sentence. Skinny has maintained his innocence, claiming that the person who brought charges against him stole a chain worth $8,000.

Discography

Mixtapes

Singles

References

External links
Official website
Skinnyfromthe9 on SoundCloud

1995 births
Living people
Rappers from New Jersey
East Coast hip hop musicians
21st-century American rappers
American hip hop singers
People from Hialeah, Florida
Musicians from Somerville, New Jersey